= House of Nomikos =

- Дом Номикоса
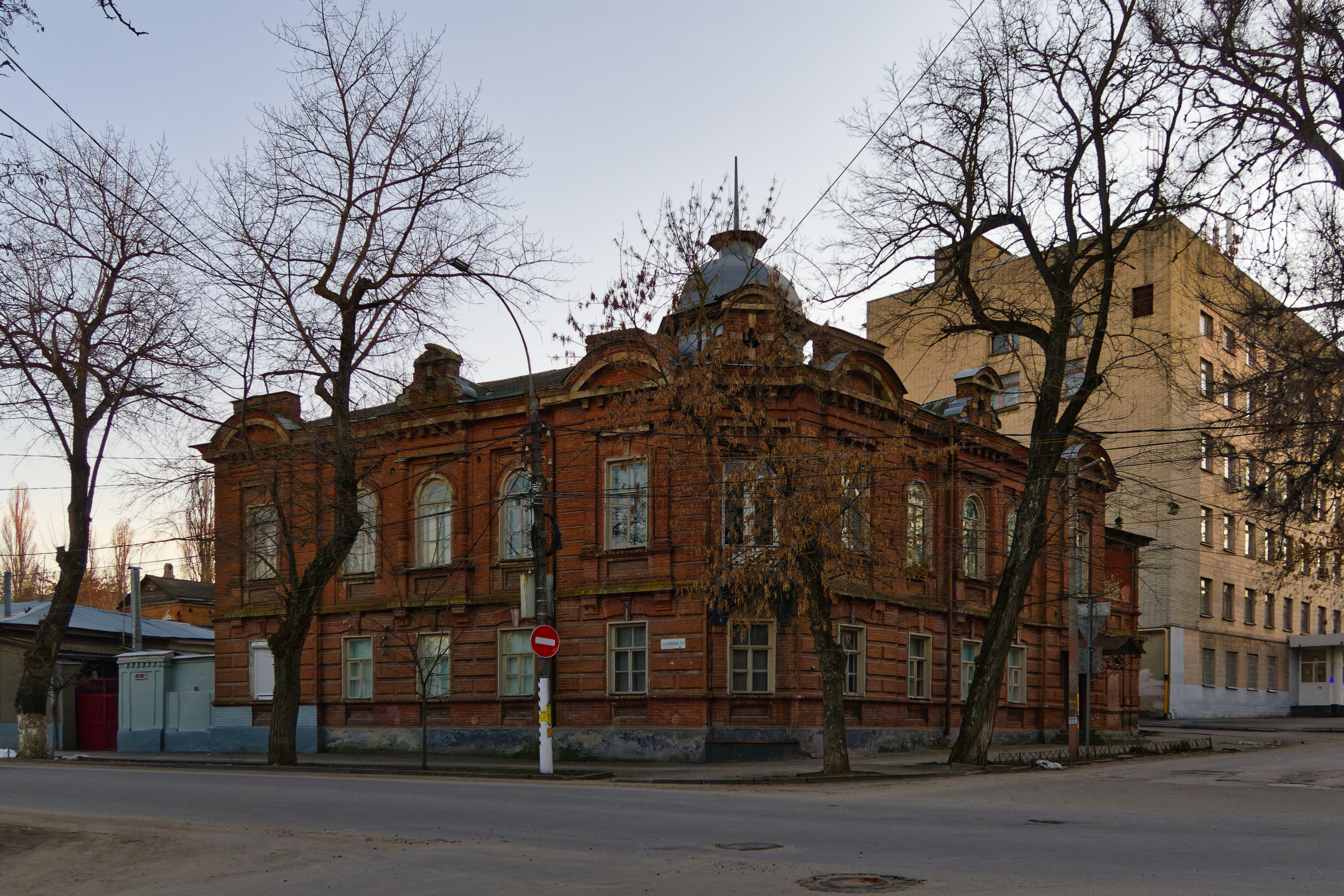
- Coordinates: 47°12′36″N 38°56′24″E

The House of Nomikos (Russian: Дом Номикоса) is an object of cultural heritage of regional value of the second half of the 19th century in the city of Taganrog of the Rostov Oblast. It is located at the address Grecheskaya Street, 53. Treats historical and cultural monuments.

== History ==
The house down the street Greek, 53 in the city of Taganrog appeared in the third quarter of the 19th century. It was constructed for a family of the temporary merchant of the II guild Nikolay Mikhaylovich Lombako. It and at his wife, Pavlina of Vasilyevna had several children. It is known of the birth of the first child – the son Vasily – on January 31, 1867, later few years the daughter Maria appeared.

In 1866–67 the house down the street Greek, 53 was sold and carried over Kalomira Vasilyevna – Anton Dmitrievich Nomikos's wife. In documents of the first half of the 19th century information which, perhaps, concerns Anton Dmitrievich was saved: there is a birth record on August 1, 1831, and about a baptism on August 16 the same year of the boy Anthony — the son Andrey Grigoryevich Nomikos and Efimiya Larionov.

The family of Anton and Kalomira Nomikos was having many children: it is known of the birth of children who received names of Vasily, Kaliopy, Ekaterina, Mikhail, Evangeliya, and Alexander. The eldest son Vasily was given birth in 1884, Alexander and Evangeli were twins. Kalomira Nomikos seriously was engaged in a reorganization of the acquired house and achieved in its results. Her husband was active in the city – founded macaroni factory, and then and a valtsevy mill – he constructed it in 1882. A production which was produced at its enterprises admitted to that which has the superior quality and was awarded several awards. About the owner interesting details are known: it had cheerful nature and was a marksman, "Illusion" which, however, existed very little based the city's third cinema hall.

Anton Nomikos died on March 12, 1894. Since 1912 partially his house was occupied a part with secret-service and commission office of the resident of Taganrog by the name of Panagiotis. In 1920 the building was occupied by the vocational medical school at different times called by the medical technical school, medical school and medical assistants and obstetric school.

The house of the merchant Nomikos till 1925 belonged to his descendants. In 1941 the brothel was open here. Since 1992 the house the building belongs to the list of objects of cultural heritage of regional value, in the house "Spetsproyekttrest" is placed.

== Description ==
The corner two-storeyed house which was constructed in brick style. At the beginning of the 20th-century, additional architectural registration in the form of a balcony and a turret appeared. Capstones, sandrail, and brick platbands became the decoration of a facade. Windows on the second floor are created in a semi-circular form and framed with three-quarter brick columns. Figured and semi-circular pediments settle down over eaves with croutons.
